Rear-Admiral Leslie Norman Mungavin  (22 March 1925 – 1995) was a two-star rank admiral in the Pakistan Navy, and a defence diplomat. He is noted for releasing his diplomatic assignment at the High Commission of Pakistan in London to command the combat assignments during the war on the Western front with India in 1971.

He also served as vice-chief of naval staff from 1975 until 1977, with a two-star rank despite the position is required an admiral to be promoted in three-star rank, the Vice-Admiral.

Career

Mungavin joined the Royal Indian Navy in 1945, and transferred to the Pakistan Navy after the partition in 1947, where his career in the navy progressed well till his retirement as VIce Chief of Naval Staff at the rank of Rear Admiral. He specialized in navigation at the training establishment  in the United Kingdom. In 1950s,  he commanded  and the Pakistan Navy flagship .

In 1964, Commander Mungavin was the commanding officer of PNS Babur, and participated in the second war with India in 1965. In 1970, Cdre. Mungavin was posted as Military and Naval Attaché at the High Commission of Pakistan in London, where his services and negotiation skills merited him a Sitara-e-Pakistan award. Cdre. Mungavin left his assignment, only to be promoted as Rear-Admiral, and took up the command as Commandant of the Pakistan Marines which he led in the Western Front of the Indo-Pakistani war against India in 1971. Furthermore, he was noted for his skills in negotiation which earned him to be decorated as and merited him with a Sitara-e-Pakistan.

In 1970s, he was elevated as the vice-chief of naval staff from 1975 until 1977, with a two-star rank despite the position is required an admiral to be promoted in three-star rank, the Vice-Admiral. In 1980s, Rear Admiral Mungavin was also involved with the negotiations with the US Department of State when the Pakistan Navy was interested in replacing their aging fleet with Gearing-class destroyers. From January 1979 to April 1980 he served as the Chairman of the Board of the Pakistan National Shipping Corporation.

Death 
Admiral Mungavin died in 1995 in England. At his request his body was cremated, ashes taken back to Pakistan and spread in the Arabian Sea. The Pakistan Navy honored him with a full military funeral and his ashes were taken out to sea on board the PNS Babur and scattered there.

References

External links
Shah, Mian Zahir (2001). "The Wit of Mungavin". Bubbles of Water: Or, Anecdotes of the Pakistan Navy. Karachi, Pakistan: PN Book Club Publication. p. 487. . Retrieved 15 August 2017.

}

1925 births
1995 deaths
Royal Indian Navy officers
Pakistani Christians
Pakistan Navy officers
Admirals of the Indo-Pakistani War of 1971
Pakistan Marines
Pakistan Navy admirals
Recipients of the Sitara-e-Pakistan
Pakistani naval attachés